Alexander Igorevich Grischuk (born October 31, 1983) is a Russian chess grandmaster. Grischuk was the Russian champion in 2009. He is also a three-time world blitz chess champion (in 2006, 2012 and 2015).

He has competed in five Candidates Tournaments: in 2007, 2011 (when he reached the final), 2013, 2018 and 2020. He also reached the semifinals of the 2000 FIDE World Championship.

Grischuk has won two team gold-medals, three team silvers, one team bronze, and one individual bronze medal at Chess Olympiads. He also holds three team gold medals, one team silver and individual gold, two silver and one bronze from the World Team Chess Championship.

Chess career

1996
In 1996, Grischuk finished in 21st place in the Boys Under-14 section of the World Youth Festival and tied for third place in the same section of the Disney Rapid Chess Championships.

1998

By January 1998 Grischuk had become a FIDE Master, finished 24th in the Moscow leg of the Russian Cup with 6/9, and finished 18th at Nizhnij Novgorod. He finished 44th in his first Russian Chess Championship, scoring 5/11 points, and was International Master and rating favourite when he tied for 8th place at the Boys Under 16 section of the World Youth Championships.

1999

In January 1999, Grischuk tied for 13th at the Hotel Anibal Open, defeating third seed Artashes Minasian in the third round. He started strongly at the Hotel Ubeda Open but slipped to tie for 7th place with 6.5/10. At Bled Open in March he finished 9th with 6/9 and at the Biel MTO Open in July finished 11th with 7/10. At the Porto San Giorgio Grischuk finished 4th with 6.5/9. In November 1999, Grischuk scored 7/9 to share first place with Sergei Volkov at the Chigorin Memorial. He made four draws as reserve board at the European Team Championship held in Batumi then was knocked out of the Russian Championship in the quarterfinals by Alexei Bezgodov.

2000

Grischuk made his first Grandmaster norm in January 2000 at the Hotel Ubeda Open scoring 7/10 for 4th place then placed 4th at the Reykjavik Open, scoring 6.5/9. At the New York Open he finished 10th with 6.5/9. In June 2000, he won the Lausanne Young Masters, defeating Ruslan Ponomariov in the final. His success gave him his first appearance in the FIDE Top 100 at 78th, with 2606 and third top Junior in July 2000. Grischuk finished 4th on tiebreaks with 5/9 at the North Sea Cup. Now a Grandmaster, he finished third with 6/11 at the 4th Russian Cup Final in Elista and won the Torshavn International in October on tiebreak with Ponomariov. He claimed individual bronze medal for his second reserve board result at the Chess Olympiad in Istanbul.

In the 2000 FIDE World Chess Championship, Grischuk reached the semifinals, losing to Alexei Shirov.

2001

In September 2001, Grischuk scored 4/6 at the inaugural Russia-Chess Summit. In January 2002, he finished second at his first Corus event with 8.5/13, half a point behind Evgeny Bareev.

2004

In the 2004 FIDE World Chess Championship he made it to the quarterfinals, where he lost 3−1 to eventual champion Rustam Kasimdzhanov. Also he shared 1st place in the traditional tournament at Poikovsky (with Sergey Rublevsky); 2nd place at the Russian Championship (behind Kasparov).

2005

Grischuk finished in the top 10 in the 2005 FIDE World Cup, qualifying him for the 2007 Candidates Tournament in May–June 2007. He won his matches against Vladimir Malakhov (+2 −0 =3) and Sergei Rublevsky (tied at +1 −1 =4, winning the rapid playoff +2 −0 =1), to advance to the eight-player 2007 FIDE World Chess Championship. In that tournament he scored 5½ out of 14, placing last in the eight-player field.

2009

In 2009, Grischuk won the Russian Chess Championship. Later that year he won the Linares tournament on tiebreak over Vasyl Ivanchuk after being invited as replacement for Veselin Topalov, who was in the Challenger's Match against Gata Kamsky.

2010

In 2010, he finished second to Topalov in Linares.

2011

Grischuk finished third in the 2008-10 FIDE Grand Prix, qualifying him as the first alternate for the Candidates Tournament of the 2012 World Chess Championship cycle. Upon the withdrawal of world No. 2 Magnus Carlsen from the candidates tournament, Grischuk was appointed to take his place. In the 2011 candidates tournament, Grischuk was seeded 6th out of eight players, and faced Levon Aronian in the first round. After splitting the four regular games 2–2, Grischuk won the rapid playoff 2½–1½ to advance to the semifinals, where he faced world No. 4 and former World Champion Vladimir Kramnik. Grischuk won the blitz playoff by 1½–½ to advance to the final, where he faced 2009 Chess World Cup winner Boris Gelfand for the right to play Viswanathan Anand for the World Championship. After five draws, Gelfand won the final game to win the match, 3½–2½.

2013

Grischuk played in the 2013 Candidates Tournament in London from 15 March to 1 April. He finished sixth, with a score of 6½/14 (+1=11-2).

2014

In November 2014 he took first place with 5½/7 at the Tashir Chess Tournament in memory of Tigran Petrosian in Moscow. This enabled him to cross the 2800 Elo rating mark.

2016

In July 2016, Grischuk won a four-game match against Ding Liren in Wenzhou, 2½–1½.

2017

In February 2017 Grischuk tied for first place with Maxime Vachier-Lagrave and Shakhriyar Mamedyarov in the first event of the FIDE Grand Prix series, held in Sharjah, UAE, taking first place on tiebreak. In July 2017, he beat Yu Yangyi 3–1 in the China-Russia Chess Grandmaster Summit Match held in Jiayuguan, China.

In December, Grischuk won the men's Basque chess event of the IMSA Elite Mind Games in Huai'an, China.

2019

In late May, Grischuk participated in the Moscow FIDE Grand Prix tournament, which is part of the qualification cycle for the 2020 World Chess Championship. The tournament was a 16-player event. Grischuk was defeated by compatriot GM Ian Nepomniachtchi in rapid tiebreaks during the tournament finale. By finishing second in the tournament, Grischuk netted 7 Grand Prix points. Grischuk then reached the semi-finals at Riga, and won the Hamburg tournament, for a total of 20 Grand Prix points. He was confirmed as a qualifier for the Candidates Tournament 2020 after the second day of the Jerusalem Grand Prix.

2020
From March 16th to 26th Grischuk played Candidates Tournament, interrupted by FIDE after 7th day due to COVID-19 pandemic. At the time of the interruption he was one point behind the leading pair made up of his compatriot Ian Nepomniachtchi and the French Grandmaster Maxime Vachier-Lagrave.

2021
From April 19th to 27th Grischuk played again at the Candidates Tournament, resumed by FIDE after more than a year. He concluded in sixth place, with 7 points out of 14.

2022 
Through February and March 2022, Grischuk played in the FIDE Grand Prix 2022. In the first leg, he placed third in Pool A with a 3/6 result. In the second leg, he finished fourth in Pool A with a result of 2/6, finishing 22nd in the standings with two points.

Team results

Chess Olympiads

Blitz chess
In 2006 Grischuk won the World Blitz Chess Championship in Rishon Lezion, Israel, with 10½/15. He won his second World Blitz Championship in 2012 in Astana, Kazakhstan, with 20 points out of 30 games. In October 2015, Grischuk won the World Blitz Championship for the third time in Berlin with a score of 15½/21, half a point ahead of Maxime Vachier-Lagrave and Vladimir Kramnik.

Personal life
Grischuk was formerly married to Ukrainian chess grandmaster Natalia Zhukova. He is now married to Ukrainian-Russian grandmaster Kateryna Lagno and they have three children together.

Notes

References

External links

 
 
 
 
 
 Interview with Alexander Grischuk

1983 births
Living people
Chess grandmasters
Chess Olympiad competitors
Russian chess players
Sportspeople from Moscow